Paira is a village in the Punjab province of Pakistan. It is located at 32°15'20N 74°44'50E with an altitude of 241 metres (793 feet). Neighbouring settlements include Qila Sobha Singh, Bariar and Charwind

References

Villages in Narowal District